Varrone Ducci (27 October 1898 – 24 July 1945) was an Italian politician, landowner and lawyer.

He served as fascist Podestà of Arezzo from 11 November 1939 to 31 August 1943.

Biography
Varrone Ducci was born in Florence, Italy in 1898 and died there in 1945 at the age of 46. He was a lawyer.

See also
 List of mayors of Arezzo

References 

1898 births
1945 deaths
Politicians from Florence
20th-century Italian politicians
Mayors of Arezzo